Disposable Arts is the second solo album by American rapper Masta Ace, his follow up album since Sittin' On Chrome (1995).

Background
The concept follows a young Brooklyn man's release from prison, his return home, and his life at "The Institute of Disposable Arts", a school in which Ace enrolls after realizing how bad the situation in Brooklyn is.

Impact
The album sold poorly compared to his previous albums, due to JCOR Entertainment folding a month after its release but it was generally well received by critics and fans alike. The cover art is an ironic nod to his "Sittin' on Chrome" days, showing Masta Ace sitting on a car seat in the street without a car. Included on the album is the song "Acknowledge", a notable diss track to rapper Boogeyman and group The High & Mighty. The song "Unfriendly Game" was used in the TV series The Wire and is included on one of its soundtracks. The song "Take A Walk" was used in the video game Saints Row, and was found on one of the various in game radio stations.

Track listing

Cast
Correction Officer: Tony Hanna
IDA Commercial: Tonedeff
Lisa: Jane Doe
Paul the Roommate: MC Paul Barman
Caller from home: Strick
Tyreek: Jugga
Newscaster: Blaise Dupuy
Bitch Nigga callers: Uneek & Drugga
Interviewer: Chyrisse Turner

Album singles

Charts

References 

2001 albums
Masta Ace albums
Albums produced by Ayatollah
Albums produced by Domingo (producer)